George Garrett (born ) is a retired broadcast journalist. He worked for CKNW in Vancouver, British Columbia, and covered the 1992 Los Angeles riots. During the riots, he was beaten by multiple rioters before being taken to the hospital by two bystanders. The incident broke two bones and caused the loss of a front tooth. He was the recipient of the Jack Webster Foundation's Bruce Hutchison Lifetime Achievement Award at the 1996 Jack Webster awards. He retired in 1999 after having been with the station for 43 years.

References 

1931 births
Journalists from British Columbia
Canadian radio journalists
Jack Webster award recipients
Bruce Hutchison Lifetime Achievement Award winners
Living people